Patrick Sarsfields Gaelic Athletic Association is a Gaelic football, hurling, camogie and ladies' Gaelic football club based in West Belfast, County Antrim, Northern Ireland.

History
Patrick Sarsfields were founded on 6 October 1906 and were named after the Jacobite leader Patrick Sarsfield, 1st Earl of Lucan (c. 1660 – 1693).

In hurling, they have only won the county championship once, in 1974. That year they reached the final of the Ulster Senior Club Hurling Championship, losing to Ballycran.

The Gaelic football team have been county champions four times, most recently in 1985.

The club attracted media attention in 2016 after two Syrian refugee children, Ahmed and Renad Soda, were stars of their underage teams.

Honours

Gaelic football
Antrim Senior Football Championship (4): 1913, 1941, 1967, 1985
Antrim Senior Football League (8): 1911, 1912, 1913, 1914, 1962, 1969, 1974, 1985
Antrim Intermediate Football Championship (1): 1995
Antrim Intermediate Football League (2): 1935, 1936
Antrim Junior Football Championship (5): 1940, 2017
Beringer Cup (2): 1955, 2006
Antrim Minor Football Championship (2): 1963, 1985

Hurling
Antrim Senior Hurling Championship (1): 1974
Antrim Senior Hurling League (3): 1930s
Antrim Intermediate Hurling Championship (2): 1972, 2017
Antrim Minor Hurling Championship (2): 1930, 1932
South Antrim Hurling League (4): 1949, 1956, 1958, 2021
South Antrim Junior Hurling Championship (4): 1941, 1944, 1953, 1984

References

External links
Official page

Gaelic games clubs in County Antrim
Gaelic football clubs in County Antrim
Sports clubs in Belfast
Hurling clubs in County Antrim